John Alexander Dirk Healey (born 25 October 1927) was a British rower. He competed in the men's coxed four event at the 1948 Summer Olympics.

References

External links
 

1927 births
Living people
British male rowers
Olympic rowers of Great Britain
Rowers at the 1948 Summer Olympics